Gadzhi may refer to:

People:
Gadzhi Abashilov (1950–2008), Russian journalist and chief of Dagestan's outlet of state-owned VGTRK media company
Gadzhi Gadzhiev (born 1945), Russian football manager, currently coaching Anzhi Makhachkala
Gadzhi Navruzov (born 1989), Russian professional football player

Places:
Gadzhi-Eynali, village in the Masally Rayon of Azerbaijan